Andrew Zbigniew Szydlo (born 1949) is a British chemist and chemistry teacher, best known for his talks and lectures on chemistry.

Biography
Szydlo was born in London, England to Polish parents, and attended Latymer Upper School, and then Imperial College London and University College London. He currently teaches – since September 1972 – chemistry at Highgate School, a private school in North London. He holds MSc, PhD, DIC, ACGI, and is a Fellow of the Royal Society of Chemistry, of which he is also a CChem. In 2020, Szydlo was awarded a Pearson National Teaching award for Lifetime Achievement.

An expert on the history of alchemy, Szydlo is the author of the standard work on the Polish alchemist, Michael Sendivogius. The thesis of his book "Water that does not wet hands": The Alchemy of Michael Sendivogius, which argues that Sendivogius' role in the discovery of oxygen has not received proper attention, has won widespread acceptance within the academic community. He advanced this argument in a leading article for History Today, co-authored with Richard Brzezinski, entitled "A New Light on Alchemy". His work on seventeenth-century science is an ongoing project to which he hopes to devote further attention. In 2015 he published Schoolmaster's Diary, a photo diary celebrating four decades of school life seen through his chemistry teacher's lens.

He frequently gives public lectures in the United Kingdom on topics including the History of Chemistry. Recent performances at Cambridge University, Durham University, University College London, the Royal Institution, Cheltenham Science Festival and Hampton Court have received much acclaim: writing in the journal Chemistry & Industry on Szydlo’s performance at Cambridge, John Wilkins remarked that "Dr Szydlo exceeded all expectations; he raced through vast tracts of practical chemistry, history, alchemy, the discovery of oxygen, the internal combustion engine, and on occasion, introduced music too. His lecture was interspersed with flashes, bangs, colour changes, detonations and eruptions, keeping the 350-strong crowd on the edge of their seats throughout." This lively, multi-media approach characterises Szydlo's performances, which include experiments drawn from a wide repertory, ranging from the chemistry of colour to pyrotechnics and high explosives. He has also appeared at several festivals as part of the Guerilla Science team. He also lectures regularly at secondary schools throughout the United Kingdom, and has remarked that he often finds the audiences he addresses at under-privileged schools the most inspiring. These lectures are sometimes featured in the local press. Szydlo also regularly gives talks for the wider community, including such institutions as the Stuart Low Trust, Haringey Council Cared for Children, and the Polish Scouting and Guiding Association. His recent Webinars for students in Turkey and Tunisia have been very well received. He has also been invited to give numerous lectures and demonstrations abroad, including Poland, Mauritius (2016, 2017, 2018, 2019, 2020) and Namibia (2016). Szydlo has the highest rank (Harcmistrz) in the Polish Scouting Association, and has regularly participated in its activities since 1965.

More recently, he has collaborated with Andrea Sella of University College London and the author Hugh Aldersey-Williams in Elements, an exhibition at the Wellcome Collection, where he spoke about the Dutch alchemist Cornelis Drebbel, situating Drebbel in a broader scientific and historical context and illustrating the talk with lively experiments. Aldersey-Williams has worked with Szydlo before, both as a pupil at Highgate School, where he recalls Szydlo as 'a man of many talents … always liable to whip out his gipsy violin mid-lesson', and in writing his recent book Periodic Tales, when he recruited Szydlo’s expertise in an attempt to recreate the experiment that discovered phosphorus.

Six of his recent lectures at the Royal Institution: Magic of Chemistry (2014), Blaze of Steel (2015), Fireworks and Waterworks (2016),  Bonfires with a Bang (2017), Chemistry of Coal (2018) and Metal Mayhem (2019) have been made available on YouTube. His Tedx talks at Newcastle and Manchester have received widespread acclaim, as has his appearance at the 15 Seconds Festival in Graz (2019). He is also featured in the Royal Society of Chemistry's 175 Faces of Chemistry.

In recent years, he has appeared in six television serials: as a chemistry teacher in That'll Teach 'em (Channel 4, 2006) and Sorcerer's Apprentice (CBBC, 2007); as a science historian in Absolute Zero (BBC4, 2007); as a chemist in Generals at War (National Geographic, 2009); in Big, Bigger, Biggest (Channel 5, 2009); and as "The Doc" in Secrets of Everything (BBC3, 2012).

Music is a passion, and he is an accomplished player of instruments including the violin, piano, bugle and accordion. So is photography, a field in which he has considerable expertise. He has exhibited his own photographs, and recently contributed a preface to a book of photographs published by the artist Stephane Graff. Other interests include Polish dancing, automobile engineering, meteorology, beekeeping, and mycology. Amongst his pupils, he is renowned for lessons which incorporate unusual and spectacular experiments, and for bursts of theatricality such as blowing fire and cooling hot drinks with liquid nitrogen before tasting them. His lecture and television performances reflect his broad cultural interests and distinctive character.

Additionally, he has a passion for automotive engineering, running a school automotive society where he teaches students about auto engineering using old Triumph Heralds.

References

Alumni of Imperial College London
Alumni of University College London
English chemists
English people of Polish descent
Schoolteachers from London
People educated at Latymer Upper School
Living people
1949 births
Science teachers